Ava Lorein Verdeflor (born January 2, 1999) is a Filipino-American artistic gymnast. She currently represents the Philippines in International competition but lives with her family in Allen, Texas, and holds dual citizenship.

Junior career 
Verdeflor competed at the Junior Asian Championships in Tashkent, Uzbekistan in April and placed 12th, securing a qualifying spot to the 2014 Summer Youth Olympics in Nanjing, China.

Senior career 
Verdeflor competed at the 2015 Southeast Asian Games. She won bronze medal and silver medal in the  Women's artistic team all-around and Women's uneven bars.

References 

1999 births
American female artistic gymnasts
Filipino female artistic gymnasts
Gymnasts at the 2014 Summer Youth Olympics
Living people
Sportspeople from Tarlac
People from Allen, Texas
World Olympic Gymnastics Academy
Southeast Asian Games silver medalists for the Philippines
Southeast Asian Games bronze medalists for the Philippines
Southeast Asian Games medalists in gymnastics
Competitors at the 2015 Southeast Asian Games
21st-century American women